Florent-Joseph-Fernand Allard, known as Fernand Allard l'Olivier (12 July 1883, Tournai - 9 June 1933, Yanongé, near Kisangani) was a Belgian painter and illustrator; known primarily for his works in the  style.

Biography   
At the age of fourteen, he was apprenticed to the Imprimerie Van Campenhout in Molenbeek, where he learned his father's trade.

He went to Paris in 1901 and enrolled at the Académie Julian, where his primary instructors were William Bouguereau and Jean-Paul Laurens. It was, however, Jules Adler, who had the most influence on him; encouraging him to paint ordinary people, rather than historical or classical scenes. For his first works, he chose the pseudonym L'Olivier, taken from his maternal grandmother, the once popular novelist, Pauline L'Olivier. In the early part of his career, he was best known for his nudes.

In 1912, he married Juliette Rossignol, the daughter of a bookseller. The following year, she gave birth to a son, who would become a well known poet. During this period, he also worked as an art critic. Later, they decided to settle in Penmarch, as they felt it would be a better place to raise a family. 

When World War I began, he attempted to enlist in a Belgian regiment, but was never called up. In 1916, as the war dragged on, he offered his services to the new camouflage section of the Belgian Army, then was transferred to the "". For two years, from his base in De Panne, he made forays into the trenches to sketch and paint. After the war, he and his family moved to Brussels. In 1920, he published a sketch book called Alphabet de guerre (Alphabet of the War). He continued to participate in exhibits at the Salon until 1928.

Visits to Africa
During this period, he made several trips; to Tunisia in 1923 and, in 1926, to Poland, where he created decorative paintings in Łódź. In 1928, his friend, the filmmaker , paid a visit to what was then the Belgian Congo and invited L'Olivier to join him. He was able to obtain money from the Colonial Ministry, by promising to bring back artistic documents for an upcoming exhibition. He met Genval in Dar es Salaam and they proceeded to what is now Katanga Province, where he set up his workshop and travelled throughout the region, painting and collecting souvenirs. He returned to Belgium early in 1929 and prepared his works for an exhibit in Antwerp.

In 1931, the world depression began to take its toll on his financial affairs. Plans for a large exhibition fell through. This prompted him to pay a second visit to Africa. In late 1932, he arrived by ship at Matadi. After spending several months visiting previously unseen places in the western Congo, he went to Léopoldville in January, 1933. There he was wined and dined by his old acquaintances until he wrote home complaining that he had no time to work. He eventually went upriver for several weeks, meeting with local dignitaries, both native and colonial. He also travelled around Lake Tanganyika and visited what is now Burundi. 

By April, he had created a sufficient number of works to be planning exhibitions in Costermansville and Léopoldville, after which his wife would meet him in Tenerife on the voyage home. In June, he was heading to Léopoldville on a river tugboat, when it made an overnight stop. At one point, while he was chatting with some people, he excused himself and headed toward his cabin. A few moments later there was a loud splash. His body was retrieved from the river three days later. The autopsy revealed a fractured skull. Nobody there could say exactly what had happened.

Selected Africanist paintings

References

Further reading 
 Jean-Pierre De Rycke, "Fernand Allard l'Olivier", in: Le Congo et l'Art belge 1880-1960, Tournai : La Renaissance du livre, 2003  pp.220-223.
 "Fernand Allard l'Olivier", in L'Orientalisme et l'Africanisme dans l'Art belge, exhibition catalog, Galerie CGER, 1984
 Lynne Thornton, "Fernand Allard L'Olivier", in Les Africanistes peintres voyageurs, ACR éditions, 1990,

External links

Homepage the Fernand Allard l'Olivier website
More works by l'Olivier @ ArtNet
Dictionnaire des peintres belges @ BALaT

1883 births
1933 deaths
Belgian painters
Belgian genre painters
Académie Julian
Belgian Congo people
Deaths by drowning
Artists from Tournai